Gona Budda Reddy, also known as Ranganatha (13th century CE), was a poet and ruler living in southern India.

Written work 
His Ranganatha Ramayanam was a pioneering work in the Telugu language on the theme of the Ramayana epic. Most scholars believe he wrote it between 1300 and 1310 A.D., possibly with help from his family. The work has become part of cultural life in Andhra Pradesh and is used in puppet shows.

Gona Dynasty 
During the Kakatiya dynasty (995-1323), Gona Budda Reddy ruled a kingdom in Mahbubnagar district from Vardhamaanapuram (currently known as Nandi Vaddemaan) and Khilla Ghanpur (Fort Ghanpur) in modern-day Ghanpur, Mahbubnagar district. He and his family, the Gona dynasty, was mostly loyal to the Kakatiya dynasty. When he died, his brother Gona Lakuma Reddy took over the kingdom and rebelled against the Kakatiya, but his son Gona Ganna Reddy remained loyal to them in Vardamanapuram, (1262-1296 AD) indirectly supporting the rule of Kakatiya Queen Rudrama Devi against opposition to female rule.

References 

Telugu poets
Year of birth missing
Year of death missing
Indian male poets
Poets from Telangana
13th-century Indian poets
Telugu monarchs
Translators of the Ramayana